
Gmina Bolesław is a rural gmina (administrative district) in Dąbrowa County, Lesser Poland Voivodeship, in southern Poland.

Villages
Gmina Bolesław contains the villages and settlements of Bolesław, Kanna, Kuzie, Pawłów, Podlipie, Samocice, Strojców, Świebodzin and Tonia.

Neighbouring gminas
Gmina Bolesław is bordered by the gminas of Gręboszów, Mędrzechów, Nowy Korczyn and Olesno.

References
Polish official population figures 2006

Boleslaw
Dąbrowa County